Lewis Ormsby Martin (1870 – 17 April 1944) was an Australian politician.

Life 
He was born on 16 May 1870 in Bairnsdale, Victoria, to miner Robert Martin and his wife Antoinette Louisa. While Lewis was still young the family moved to New South Wales. Here he was educated privately by a tutor, W. Compton. He was articled a solicitor's clerk in 1889, and studied at the University of Sydney, receiving a Bachelor of Arts in 1893 and a Bachelor of Law in 1895, the year he was admitted as a solicitor. He settled in Taree, where he accumulated several properties. In 1900 he married Lucy Danvers, with whom he had eight children. He died at Taree in 1944.

Career 
He served on Taree Council from 1906 to 1928, with periods as mayor from 1911 to 1913. A member of the Farmers and Settlers Association, he moved politically from the Liberal Party to the Progressive Party before being elected as a Nationalist member of the New South Wales Legislative Assembly in 1927, representing Oxley. He was Secretary for Public Works, Minister for Local Government and Minister for Justice from 1932 to 1939. Martin was defeated by an independent candidate in 1941.

References

 

1872 births
1944 deaths
Nationalist Party of Australia members of the Parliament of New South Wales
United Australia Party members of the Parliament of New South Wales
Members of the New South Wales Legislative Assembly
People from Bairnsdale
University of Sydney alumni
Australian solicitors
New South Wales local councillors
People from Taree